Monomoy Point Light is a historic light in Chatham, Massachusetts.

The station was established in 1823.  The first light was a wood tower and brick lantern room on top of the keeper's house. The current tower, one of the first made of cast iron, was built in 1849.

After the opening of the Cape Cod Canal in 1914, most vessels bound from south of the Cape to the Boston area took the shorter and safer route through the canal, so there was much less traffic past the light and the light was deactivated in 1923.

It was added to the National Register of Historic Places as Monomoy Point Lighthouse on November 1, 1979, reference number 79000324.

The keeper's house is preserved and serves today as a guest house. The Lighthouse Preservation Society, the Massachusetts Audubon Society, and The Friends of Monomoy support preservation of the lighthouse and keeper's house. It lies within the Monomoy Wilderness.

See also
National Register of Historic Places listings in Barnstable County, Massachusetts

References

External links

Lighthouses completed in 1849
Lighthouses on the National Register of Historic Places in Massachusetts
Lighthouses in Barnstable County, Massachusetts
Chatham, Massachusetts
Historic American Engineering Record in Massachusetts
National Register of Historic Places in Barnstable County, Massachusetts
1823 establishments in Massachusetts
Lighthouses completed in 1823